Bartlett is a commuter railroad station in Bartlett, Illinois, a western suburb of Chicago. It is served by Metra's Milwaukee District West Line, with service to Union Station in downtown Chicago, and northwest to Elgin. As of 2018, Bartlett is the 53rd busiest of Metra's 236 non-downtown stations, with an average of 988 weekday boardings. Travel time to Union Station ranges from 51 minutes to 1 hour and 11 minutes, with faster times on peak trains.

As of December 12, 2022, Bartlett is served by 42 trains (20 inbound, 22 outbound) on weekdays, by all 24 trains (12 in each direction) on Saturdays, and by all 18 trains (nine in each direction) on Sundays and holidays.

The station is at South Oak Avenue and West Bartlett Avenue in downtown Bartlett.

History
The depot in Bartlett was built in 1873.  It was the last remaining original depot left along what used to be the Chicago, Milwaukee, St. Paul and Pacific Railroad. Bartlett station was rebuilt by Metra between 2004 and opened on December 11, 2007. The original station house has been converted into a local railroad museum.

Status
Eastbound trains stop at the new station, which only has a southern platform.  Westbound trains stop across from the old station, which now only has a northern platform.  The new station's platform only has one pedestrian crossing on the far west side.

Parking has been expanded with the installation of the new station.  However, since the trains do not drop off and pick up in the same spot, commuters generally have a moderate walk one direction or another.

References

Pohl, Kimberly. "Metra's shelter from the storm opens in Bartlett." Daily Herald 11 December 2007

External links

Station House from Google Maps Street View

Metra stations in Illinois
Former Chicago, Milwaukee, St. Paul and Pacific Railroad stations
Railway stations in the United States opened in 1873
Railway stations in the United States opened in 2007
Bartlett, Illinois
Railway stations in Cook County, Illinois